Onion knight may refer to:

 Davos Seaworth, a character in George R. R. Martin's A Song of Ice and Fire novel series and television series Game of Thrones
 The characters Siegmeyer, Siegward and Sieglinde of Catarina in the Dark Souls games
 A "job" available to characters in some of the Final Fantasy games